Ganzhu is an industry-based town lying on the Fu River in northern Guangchang County, Fuzhou, Jiangxi, China. During the Song dynasty, it was called Lumaozhou. Ganzhu is adjacent in the east to Qianshan Township, in the south to Xujiang (a town), a recreation farm to its west and Nanfeng County to the north, which it borders. Ganzhuwei, its town government, resides 13 kilometres away from the county seat. Also nicknamed the "first town of Xuyuan", Ganzhu has at least 20 attractions, one of which is the world's largest lotus field. The town consists of 4,761 households and  governs one residential community and the following 12 villages:

Ganzhu Village
Luojia Village
Elong Village
Zhuxi Village
Pingshang Village
Longxi Village
Chaohua Village
Datian Village
Dasheng Village
Zhangshu Village
Tushi Village
Dongyuan Village

References 

Guangchang County
Township-level divisions of Jiangxi